Frank Zuna (January 2, 1893 – January 1983) was an American long-distance runner. In 1921, he won the Boston Marathon. Three years later, he competed in the marathon at the 1924 Summer Olympics.

References

External links
 

1893 births
1983 deaths
Athletes (track and field) at the 1924 Summer Olympics
American male long-distance runners
Boston Marathon male winners
American male marathon runners
Olympic track and field athletes of the United States
Track and field athletes from Newark, New Jersey